Majestic is the eighth full-length studio album from the German power metal band Gamma Ray, released in 2005. The band also released an LP version through their website to complement the supporting tour, limited to 1500 copies worldwide.

Guitarist Henjo Ritcher was injured during the Majestic tour from falling down a flight of stairs on a ferry between Sweden and Finland. He was forced to sit out on half the tour due to his injury.

The song "Blood Religion", with lyrics about vampires, became a trademark song of Gamma Ray, with fans in concert chanting some of the main chorus lines during the song similar to how fans recited the main chorus to "Future World", a Helloween song.

Track listing

Japanese Bonus Track

Personnel 
 Kai Hansen – vocals, guitars
 Henjo Richter – guitars, keyboards
 Dirk Schlächter – bass guitar
 Dan Zimmermann – drums

Technical personnel 
 Produced and engineered by: Dirk Schlächter, Kai Hansen
 Mastered at: Finnvox Studios, Helsinki, Finland
 Cover Painting by: Hervé Monjeaud
 Digital Artwork and Booklet Design by: Henjo Richter

Charts

References

2005 albums
Gamma Ray (band) albums
Albums produced by Kai Hansen